Kadison may refer to:

Joshua Kadison (born 1963), American singer-songwriter, pianist, writer
Luba Kadison (1906–2006), Lithuanian Jewish actress, active in Yiddish theatre
Richard Kadison (1925–2018), American mathematician
Rosemary Kadison (1932–2019), Sri Lankan Burgher author of historical romance novels
Zak Kadison, American film producer

See also
Fuglede-Kadison determinant
Kadison transitivity theorem
Kadison-Kastler metric
Kadison-Singer problem
Kaplansky-Kadison conjecture